Chapter Three: Viva Emiliano Zapata is an album by Argentinian saxophonist and composer Gato Barbieri released on the Impulse! label.

Reception
The AllMusic review by Thom Jurek called the album "a stellar recording, and of the four chapters in the series, the one most accessible to most jazz fans".

Track listing
All compositions by Gato Barbieri except as indicated
 "Milonga Triste" (Homero Manzi, Sebastian Piana) - 5:00 
 "Lluvia Azul" - 7:44
 "El Sublime" - 5:51
 "La Padrida" - 4:46
 "Cuando Vuelva a Tu Lado (What a Difference a Day Makes)" (Stanley Adams, María Grever) - 5:27
 "Viva Emiliano Zapata" - 6:06

The album was recorded on June 25 (tracks 1, 4) and June 26 (tracks 2-3, 5), 1974.

Personnel
Gato Barbieri - tenor saxophone
Randy Brecker, Bob McCoy, Victor Paz - trumpet, flugelhorn
Buddy Morrow - trombone
Alan Raph - bass trombone
Ray Alonge, Jim Buffington - French horn
Howard Johnson - tuba, flugelhorn, bass clarinet, baritone saxophone
Seldon Powell - piccolo, flute, alto flute, alto saxophone, baritone saxophone
Eddie Martinez - piano, electric piano
Paul Metzke - electric guitar
George Davis - electric guitar, acoustic guitar
Ron Carter - bass, electric bass
Grady Tate - drums
Ray Armando, Luis Mangual, Ray Mantilla, Portinho - Latin percussion
Chico O'Farrill - arranger, conductor

References

Impulse! Records albums
Gato Barbieri albums
1974 albums